Wingo is a home rule-class city in Graves County, Kentucky, United States. The population was 632 at the 2010 census.

History

Wingo was established in 1854 as a stop along the New Orleans and Ohio Railroad, a predecessor line of the Illinois Central.  The city was originally named "Wingo's Station" for local landowner Jerman J. Wingo, who provided the land for the depot.  A post office was moved to the station from nearby Point Curve in 1862, and the city incorporated in 1872.  The "Station" was dropped from the name in 1882. In 2021, Wingo-born Clayton Ray Mullins was arrested and charged in the assault of Washington, D.C. Metropolitan Police Officer "A.W." amidst that year's United States Capitol Attack, which was the focus of a subsequent long-form story in the New York Times.

Geography
U.S. Route 45 passes through the center of town connecting the two larger cities. The Purchase Parkway runs just west of Wingo, with access from Exit 14.

Demographics

As of the census of 2000, there were 581 people, 246 households, and 177 families residing in the city. The racial makeup of the city was 96.21% White, 2.93% African American, 0.34% Native American, 0.17% from other races, and 0.34% from two or more races. Hispanic or Latino of any race were 1.20% of the population.

There were 246 households, out of which 32.1% had children under the age of 18 living with them, 51.2% were married couples living together, 15.9% had a female householder with no husband present, and 28.0% were non-families. 25.2% of all households were made up of individuals, and 15.0% had someone living alone who was 65 years of age or older. The average household size was 2.36 and the average family size was 2.71.

In the city, the population was spread out, with 26.7% under the age of 18, 6.5% from 18 to 24, 25.1% from 25 to 44, 24.6% from 45 to 64, and 17.0% who were 65 years of age or older. The median age was 39 years. For every 100 females, there were 82.7 males. For every 100 females age 18 and over, there were 82.1 male.

The median income for a household in the city was $28,083, and the median income for a family was $30,500. Males had a median income of $30,000 versus $19,375 for females. The per capita income for the city was $17,526. About 17.7% of families and 17.0% of the population were below the poverty line, including 18.0% of those under age 18 and 13.0% of those age 65 or over.

References

External links

Cities in Graves County, Kentucky
Cities in Kentucky